Estophilia (from Greek: φίλος, filos - "dear, loving") refers to the ideas and activities of people not of Estonian descent who are sympathetic to or interested in Estonian language, Estonian literature or Estonian culture, the history of Estonia and Estonia in general. Such people are known as Estophiles. The opposite of Estophilia is Estophobia.

The term particularly refers to the activities of the Estophile Movement of the late 18th to early 19th century, when Baltic German scholars began documenting and promoting Estonian culture and language. This movement played a crucial role triggering the Estonian Age of Awakening almost 100 years later, which eventually led to the Estonian Declaration of Independence in 1918, the Estonian War of Independence (1918–1920) and the foundation of the Republic of Estonia.

Background 
Since the Northern Crusades, Estonian culture had been rather suppressed in society, and the ruling culture – the one that governed cities, partook in the Hanseatic league, and organised trade – was Germanic, Indigenous Estonian culture was largely restricted to the peasants. While vertical mobility was not impossible, the ethnic Estonians that became citizens or landlords tended to Germanise voluntarily.

However, while this suppression largely isolated the Germanic administrators from Estonian lower classes, it did not destroy the native culture.  The relatively long time of peace from Swedish rule onwards gave the upper classes an opportunity to take up hobbies, and some of them ended up learning about the native Estonian culture, in the process, contributing to systematic understanding of it.

The Enlightenment era brought with it greater tolerance and spread the desire to educate the uneducated. For example, the very first Estonian language periodical publication, the Lühhike öppetus (Estonian for Brief Instruction), concerned medical techniques.

History

Estophile Enlightenment Period (1750–1840) 

Educated German immigrants and local Baltic Germans in Estonia, educated at German universities introduced Enlightenment ideas that propagated freedom of thinking and brotherhood and equality. The French Revolution provided a powerful motive for the enlightened local upper class to create literature for the peasantry. The freeing of the peasantry from serfdom on the nobles estates in 1816 in Southern Estonia: Governorate of Livonia (Russian: Лифляндская губерния) and 1819 in Northern Estonia: Governorate of Estonia (Russian: Эстляндская губерния) by Alexander I of Russia gave rise to a debate as to the future fate of the former enslaved peoples. Although Baltic Germans at large regarded the future of Estonians as being a fusion with the Baltic Germans, the Estophile educated class admired the ancient culture of the Estonians and their era of freedom before the conquests by Danes and Germans in the 13th century. The Estophile Enlightenment Period formed the transition from religious Estonian literature to newspapers written in Estonian for the mass public.

The ideas of Johann Gottfried Herder greatly influenced the Baltic German intelligentsia to see the value in the indigenous culture. Inspired by Herder's collection of European and Estonian folk songs, they came to view native folklore as natural expressions of truth and spontaneity. As a result, they founded several scientific societies, published textbooks for schools, newspapers and literary works of considerable merit, such as the construction of the epic Kalevipoeg from folk sources.

Otto Wilhelm Masing and Garlieb Merkel were prominent Estophiles. Masing was one of the main advocates of peasant education and published a weekly newspaper in the Estonian language called "Maa rahva Näddali Leht" (Peasants' Weekly) from 1821.
The Litterarum Societatis Esthonicae (Estonian: Õpetatud Eesti Selts) (English: Learned Estonian Society) was established in Tartu in 1838, which counted as its members Friedrich Robert Faehlmann and Friedrich Reinhold Kreutzwald, author of the Estonian national epic Kalevipoeg which was inspired by the Finnish epic Kalevala.

Folklore recording 

Folklore being a relatively easily identifiable collectible, a number of Estophiles have undertaken recording various folktales and folk songs.  On one hand, this led to development of Estonian literary tradition; on another, growing amounts of written Estonian language texts necessitated development of (relatively) unified rules of orthography, and thus, led to analysis of Estonian grammar and phonetics.

Linguistic analyses 
An Estonian grammar was printed in German in 1637. Johann Heinrich Rosenplänter published the first academic journal in 1813 on an Estonian topic called Beiträge zur genauern Kenntniß der ehstnischen Sprache (Towards a more precise Knowledge of the Estonian Language), aimed at developing written Estonian. In 1843, a grammar of the Estonian language was compiled by pastor Eduard Ahrens using the Finnish and popular orthography rather than the German-Latin models used previously.

Modern Estophiles

While the significance of Estophiles has waned over the centuries, a number of people (Astrīde Ivask, Seppo Kuusisto, Kazuto Matsumura and others) are still widely regarded as such.  Since World War II, many of the Estophiles around the world have been in close connection with various Estonian exile communities. One of the most active Estophile organizations is the Tuglas Society  in Finland, named after the Estonian writer Friedebert Tuglas.

Scholarship Estophilus
In order to promote the study of Estonian language and culture, the Estonian Institute offers an annual scholarship. The objective of the scholarship is to fund research and studies conducted in Estonia by academically advanced students interested in Estonian language and culture. The scholarship is financed by the Estonian Ministry of Education and Research.

See also 
 Anglophile
 Fennophile
 Francophile
 Russophile

References

Further reading 
 Johann Gottfried Herder (University of California): 'Georg Julius von Schultz (Dr. Bertram), 1808–1875.  Possibilities and Limitations of Estophilia among the Baltic Germans in the 19th century'.  Printed in Zeitschrift für Ostforschung. (Google Books preview)
 Ea Jansen (Estonian Institute): How Estonian literary culture was born

 
Estophiles
Education in Estonia
Admiration of foreign cultures
Estonian nationalism